Dopplr was a free social networking service, launched in 2007, that allowed users to create itineraries of their travel plans and spot correlations with their contacts' travel plans in order to arrange meetings at any point on their journey. Additional features included allowing the user to calculate the carbon footprint their journeys have produced. The site was named after Christian Doppler, discoverer of the Doppler effect. The company was based in the "Silicon Roundabout" area of London.

Notable staff
Marko Ahtisaari: CEO and co-founder
 Matt Biddulph: CTO and co-founder
 Matt Jones: CDO and co-founder
Dan Gillmor: Founding Traveller
Lisa Sounio:  Chairman of the Board

Investors 
First-round angel investors in the site included Martin Varsavsky, Joichi Ito, Reid Hoffman, Saul Klein and Marko Ahtisaari. Second-round investors in fall 2008 were: Tom Glocer, Esther Dyson, Tyler Brûlé, Joshua Schachter, Yat Siu and Brian Behlendorf.

Reception

A survey carried out in early 2008 on influential technology figures by the Guardian Media Group named Dopplr as a company to watch out for.
The Evening Standard named Matt Biddulph and Matt Jones, two of the site's founders, among the thousand most influential people in London in 2007 and again in 2008.

Shutdown
On September 28, 2009, Dopplr announced that they had been acquired by Nokia. Within a year questions were being raised as to the future of the site, with commentators noting that Dopplr's blog had not been updated since two days after the acquisition and its number of unique monthly users had dropped from 39,000 to 29,000. In a statement issued in September 2010 a Nokia spokesperson reported "we have decided to bring it into a maintenance mode ... but will not develop it further at this stage."

In October 2013, the front page was updated with an announcement that the service would close on 1 November 2013, which it subsequently did.

References

British social networking websites
Internet services supporting OpenID
Geosocial networking
Defunct companies based in London
Mobile social software
Nokia services